Intelsat III F-1 was a communications satellite intended to be operated by Intelsat. Launched towards geostationary orbit in 1968 it failed to achieve orbit.

Design

The first of eight Intelsat III satellites to be launched, Intelsat III F-1 was built by TRW. It was a  spacecraft equipped with two transponders to be powered by body-mounted solar cells generating 183 watts of power. It had a design life of five years and carried an SVM-2 apogee motor for propulsion..

Launch
Intelsat III F-1 was launched on the maiden flight of the Delta M rocket, flying from Launch Complex 17A at the Cape Canaveral Air Force Station. The launch took place at 00:09:00 UTC on September 19, 1968, with the spacecraft bound for a geosynchronous transfer orbit. 

It was to go in operation above the Atlantic Ocean in time to relay broadcasts of the next month's Olympics in {{nowrap|Mexico City.

Twenty seconds after liftoff a fault became apparent in the gyroscope used to monitor the rate at which the rocket pitched over. Control of the rocket was subsequently lost, with it beginning to disintegrate around 102 seconds into the flight. At 108 seconds after launch the rocket was destroyed by range safety.

See also

 1968 in spaceflight

References

Intelsat satellites
Spacecraft launched in 1968
Satellite launch failures